CNPPM Vocational High School is a high school in Kattachira, Mavelikkara, Alappuzha District, Kerala, India.
The school was earlier known as Captain NP Pillai Memorial High School (CNPPMHS).

External links 
 School website 1

References 

Schools in Alappuzha district
High schools and secondary schools in Kerala